Ochicha is a village in Ngugo town of Ikeduru Local Government Area of Imo state, Nigeria.

Towns in Imo State